David McEachran (born 5 December 1903 in Clydebank, Scotland, died 21 January 1983 in Brampton, Ontario, Canada) was an early twentieth century Scottish football wing forward who played professionally in Scotland, Northern Ireland, England, Canada and the United States.

Career
In January 1924 McEachran signed with Vale of Leven F.C. in the Scottish Football League. In July 1924, he transferred to Clydebank. In 1926, he moved to Preston North End of The Football League, playing only one league game on 2 April 1924. That summer, he left Britain to sign with the Fall River Marksmen in the American Soccer League. In May 1927, the Marksmen crushed Holley Carburetor F.C. in the 1927 National Challenge Cup final. McEachran scored two of the Marksmen goals in their 7–0 victory. He began the 1927–28 season with the Marksmen before transferring to the Boston Soccer Club at the end of the season.

When the ASL was declared an "outlaw league" in the summer of 1928, McEachran moved to the IRT Rangers in the Eastern Soccer League, a rival league created by United States Football Association. He appeared to have returned to the Wonder Workers that season as he played twenty-four games in 1928–29. The Wonder Workers folded at the end of the season and McEachran moved to the Boston Bears for the fall 1929 season. He then transferred to the New Bedford Whalers for the 1929–1930 season. After eight games, he moved to the Providence Gold Bugs. In May 1930, he moved to Canada where he played with Montreal Carsteel of the National Soccer League, winning the Carls-Rite Cup as a member of the Montreal all-star team. He was in Montreal as late as October 1932 when Carsteel lost the league championship to Toronto Ulster.

He returned to Scotland and signed with St Johnstone in November 1932, though his contract was cancelled one month later. He then played briefly for Beith. His career ended in 1933 due to a knee injury while playing for Linfield in Northern Ireland.

References

1903 births
American Soccer League (1921–1933) players
Boston Bears players
Boston Soccer Club players
Clydebank F.C. (1914) players
Eastern Professional Soccer League (1928–29) players
Expatriate soccer players in Canada
Expatriate soccer players in the United States
Fall River Marksmen players
Association football forwards
IRT Rangers players
Montreal Carsteel players
New Bedford Whalers players
Preston North End F.C. players
Providence Gold Bug players
Scottish expatriate footballers
Scottish expatriate sportspeople in Canada
Scottish expatriate sportspeople in the United States
Scottish footballers
St Johnstone F.C. players
Sportspeople from Clydebank
Footballers from West Dunbartonshire
1983 deaths
Beith F.C. players
Linfield F.C. players
Kirkintilloch Rob Roy F.C. players
Canadian National Soccer League players
NIFL Premiership players
Scottish Junior Football Association players